German Antarctic Expedition can refer to:

 Eduard Dallmann's expedition of 1873–74, in Grönland
 First German Antarctic Expedition of 1901–03
 Second German Antarctic Expedition of 1911–13
 Third German Antarctic Expedition of 1938